Cracking Up is an American television sitcom created by Mike White, who also served as the series' head writer. It aired on the Fox Network on Monday nights from March 9 to April 5, 2004.

Premise
In the pilot episode, a psychiatrist (Henry Gibson)  is sent to examine Tanner Shackleton (Bret Loehr), a child of a Beverly Hills family, only to discover that Tanner doesn't have any problems — his family does. After the pilot episode, the story was about Ben Baxter (Jason Schwartzman), a student who moves into the Shackletons' guest house, interacting with Tanner (Bret Loehr) and his crazy family.

Crew
 Paul Weitz ....  executive producer (12 episodes, 2004–2006)
 Mike White ....  executive producer (12 episodes, 2004–2006)
 Chris Weitz ....  executive producer (9 episodes, 2004)
 Dana Baratta ....  supervising producer (2 episodes, 2004–2006)
 Brad Grey ....  executive producer (2 episodes, 2004–2006)
 Kim Hamberg ....  associate producer (2 episodes, 2004–2006)
 James C. Hart ....  producer (2 episodes, 2004–2006)
 David Hemingson ....  co-executive producer (2 episodes, 2004–2006)
 Alan J. Higgins ....  co-executive producer (2 episodes, 2004–2006)
 Phil Lord ....  consulting producer (2 episodes, 2004–2006)
 Christopher Miller ....  consulting producer (2 episodes, 2004–2006)
 Peter Traugott ....  executive producer (2 episodes, 2004–2006)
 Denis Biggs ....  producer (unknown episodes)
 Gregg Glickman ....  associate producer (unknown episodes)
 Danielle Weinstock .... co-producer

Cast
Molly Shannon as Lesley Shackleton
Christopher McDonald as Ted Shackleton
Caitlin Wachs as Chloe Shackleton
Jake Sandvig as Preston Shackleton
Bret Loehr as Tanner Shackleton
David Walton as Liam Connor
Jason Schwartzman as Ben Baxter

Episodes

References

External links
 
 

2004 American television series debuts
2004 American television series endings
2000s American single-camera sitcoms
English-language television shows
Fox Broadcasting Company original programming
Television series by 20th Century Fox Television
Television series created by Mike White